Robin David Scott (born 21 March 1953) is an Australian politician. He was elected to the Western Australian Legislative Council at the 2017 state election, as a One Nation member in Mining and Pastoral Region. He served until his defeat in 2021.

Scott previously contested the Division of Kalgoorlie at the 2001 and 2004 federal elections. He also contested the Division of Brand at the 2007 election.

References

1953 births
Living people
One Nation members of the Parliament of Western Australia
Members of the Western Australian Legislative Council
Scottish emigrants to Australia
People from Kalgoorlie
People from Wishaw
Pauline Hanson's One Nation politicians
21st-century Australian politicians
Politicians from North Lanarkshire